Queen's Castle, also known as Camp Fossenvue or simply Fossenvue (an anagram for "seven of us")), is the remnant of a historic camp located at Lodi in Seneca County, New York.  It is a rustic, lakeside camp structure built about 1881 on the shore of Seneca Lake.

Background
It is a one-story, roughly square, 17 feet, 6 inches by 18 feet, structure surmounted by a steeply pitched wood shingled hipped roof.  It is the sole surviving component of Camp Fossenvue, established in 1875 as an informal, lakeside summer retreat where liberally minded young women could indulge in a variety of radical, even scandalous, intellectual, physical, and recreational activities.  Its last year of operation as a women's camp was in 1901. In 1924, the site was sold to the Elmira Council of Boy Scouts for Camp Seneca, which continued to operate until 1989. The United States Department of Agriculture purchased the property in 1996, adding it to the Finger Lakes National Forest.

It was designed by "locally prominent" Arthur Nash, who seems to be North Carolina architect Arthur C. Nash, who was born in Geneva, New York.)

It was listed on the National Register of Historic Places in 1999.

References

External links
Fossenvue description
 Embers from Fossenvue backlogs, 1875-1900. From the Rare Book and Special Collections Division at the Library of Congress

Houses on the National Register of Historic Places in New York (state)
History of women's rights in the United States
History of women in New York (state)
Houses in Seneca County, New York
National Register of Historic Places in Seneca County, New York